Ŭnp'a station is a railway station in Ŭnp'a-ŭp, Ŭnp'a County, South Hwanghae Province, North Korea, on the Hwanghae Ch'ŏngnyŏn Line of the Korean State Railway. It is also the eastern terminus of the Ŭnnyul Line.

History
Ŭnp'a station was opened by the Chosen Government Railway on 1 October 1944, along with the rest of the standard-gauge Hwanghae Main Line.

References

Railway stations in North Korea